The Monmouth County Park System is an agency that maintains over 40 parks and recreational areas, in Monmouth County, New Jersey, United States. Established in 1960, the Park System takes up 5.9% of Monmouth County's total acreage. The largest park in the county is Turkey Swamp Park in Freehold with 2,388 acres. The most visited park in the county in 2021 was the Manasquan Reservoir in Howell with 1,412,586 visits. The entire Park System had a total of 8,668,914 visitors in 2021 compared to 645,354 residents of Monmouth County.

List of parks

*Indicates the site is undeveloped

**Historic Longstreet Farm is part of Holmdel Park

Golf courses

Statistics 
In 2021, the Monmouth County Park System acquired 529 new acres of land, adding up to a grand total of 18,003 acres; 57% of this is forest, 25% is field, 6% is water, 3% is wetland, 9% is developed (impervious), and 3% is other. They have a total of 43 parks and golf courses. There are 148 miles of trails, 32 miles are paved, 30 miles are easy, 76 miles are moderate, and 10 miles are challenging. There are a total of 113 recreational facilities. In 2021, the Park System offered 5,178 recreational programs, with a program attendance of 93,983. The park system had six major events, with a total attendance of 119,024. The Park System had 347 full-time staff, 492 seasonal part-time staff, and 62 program staff/instructors.

Finances 
The Monmouth County Park System began 2021 with a balance of $112,704,820, with $12,550,185 coming from their trust, and $154,635 coming from donations. They had a total income of $45,511,756 and a total expenditure of $42,291,297, leaving them with a ending fund balance of $15,925,279.

References

External links

 
County government agencies in New Jersey
County parks departments in the United States
1960 establishments in New Jersey
Government agencies established in 1960